Jamie Jacobs (born 3 December 1997) is a Dutch professional footballer who plays as a midfielder for Eredivisie club Cambuur.

Club career
He made his Eerste Divisie debut for Jong AZ on 18 August 2017 in a game against FC Den Bosch.

He moved to SC Cambuur in July 2019.

Personal life
He is the brother of fellow professional footballer Joey Jacobs.

References

External links
 
 

1997 births
People from Purmerend
Living people
Dutch footballers
SC Cambuur players
Eredivisie players
Eerste Divisie players
Association football midfielders
Jong AZ players
Footballers from North Holland